Augusto Sebastián Barrios Silva (born October 3, 1991), known as Augusto Barrios, is a Chilean footballer of Afro descent currently playing for Unión Española of the Primera División in Chile.

Career statistics

Titles 
 San Marcos de Arica 2012 and 2013-14 (Primera B de Chile Championship)

Notes

References

External links 
 
 

1991 births
Living people
Chilean footballers
San Marcos de Arica footballers
C.D. Antofagasta footballers
Universidad de Chile footballers
Chilean Primera División players
Primera B de Chile players
Association football defenders
People from Arica